The Lightweight Exo-atmospheric Projectile (LEAP) is a lightweight miniaturized kinetic kill vehicle designed to destroy incoming ballistic missiles both inside  or outside the Earth's atmosphere. The warhead is delivered to the interception point by a system such as the Aegis Ballistic Missile Defense System.

History 
Development began in 1985 by the Strategic Defense Initiative Organization, which pioneered the development of miniaturized kill vehicle technology. It was originally created by the now-defunct Hughes Aircraft Company; the modern versions are developed and built by Raytheon.

See also 
 Exoatmospheric Kill Vehicle

References 

Missile defense